A Tropical Cyclone Formation Alert (TCFA) is a bulletin released by the U.S. Navy-operated Joint Typhoon Warning Center in Honolulu, Hawaii or the Fleet Weather Center in Norfolk, Virginia, warning of the possibility of a tropical cyclone forming from a tropical disturbance that has been monitored. Such alerts are generally always issued when it is fairly certain that a tropical cyclone will form and are not always released before cyclone genesis, particularly if the cyclone appears suddenly. The TCFA consists of several different checks that are performed by the on-duty meteorologist of the system and its surroundings. If the condition being checked is met, a certain number of points are given to the system.

Parts of the TCFA

Section 1
The first section of the TCFA contains information on the area of the alert as well as the estimated center of the circulation. The estimated maximum sustained winds are provided as well.

Section 2
The second section generally contains more specific information pertaining to the system. Information such as location relative to nearby cities or places of interest can usually be found in this section. Some of the reasoning for the issuance of the TCFA, which usually consists of recent changes in the system, can be found here. The section always ends with a statement as to the potential for development, which the JTWC will rank as either low, medium, or high (formerly poor, fair, or good).

Section 3
This final section contains the time of the next bulletin on this system, which will update the system's progress over the elapsed time. The bulletin will be either another TCFA, a cancellation message, or the first advisory/warning on the system. The issuance of another TCFA would occur if the system remains in a state similar to its current state. A cancellation message would indicate that the likelihood of the system to develop into a tropical cyclone at the current time has decreased. An advisory would indicate that a tropical cyclone has indeed formed, and poses a future threat to the areas in the box defined in Section 1.

Sample alert

Issuance checklist 
The JTWC and FWC-N follow a checklist when deciding whether or not to issue a TCFA on tropical disturbances. The checklist is updated every few years, and the JTWC checklist may differ slightly from the FWC-N checklist, which is shown below. If a system gets 35 to 38 points, a TCFA may be issued depending on Dvorak trends, and if a system gets 39 points or more a TCFA should be issued.

Surface

500 mb height

200 mb height

Sea surface temperature

Satellite data

Miscellaneous

See also
National Hurricane Center, which normally issues advisories without a TCFA being issued if certain conditions are met.

References
Fleet Weather Center Norfolk Tropical Page

External links
JTWC Advisories Page

Tropical cyclone meteorology